Eduardo Valentín Serrano Torres (Caracas, February 14, 1911 – Caracas, October 13, 2008), was a Venezuelan popular musician, conductor and composer. He composed many important Venezuelan merengue; one of his most important works was the song "Barlovento".  He won the National Music Prize in 1988.  He died on October 13, 2008, at the age of 97.

References

External links 
 
 Chacao pays tribute to Eduardo Serrano
 A biography of Eduardo Serrano

1911 births
2008 deaths
Male composers
People from Caracas
Venezuelan composers
Venezuelan folk musicians
20th-century male musicians